Puncuri or Puikiri may refer to:
 Puncuri people, an ethnic group of Peru
 Puncuri language, a language of Peru

See also 
 Punkurí (es), an archeological site in Peru